is a railway station in Minamiaso, Kumamoto Prefecture, Japan. It is on the Takamori Line, operated by the Minamiaso Railway. 

Following the damage from severe earthquakes in April 2016, the entire Takamori Line was shut down. Service was resumed in July of the same year.

External links
Minamiaso-Shirakawasuigen Station (Minamiaso Railway website)

References

Railway stations in Kumamoto Prefecture
Railway stations in Japan opened in 2012